Yang Sheng or Yangsheng or variation, may refer to:

People

Surnamed "Yang" given named "Sheng"
 Yáng Shēng (楊昇; born 1993), Australian-rules footballer
  (杨晟; turn of the 20th century), Ambassador for China to Germany; see List of ambassadors of China to Germany
 Yang Sheng (楊昇; 1399–1441), Chieftain of the Chiefdom of Bozhou
 Yang Sheng (楊升), a master of the Mogu style of traditional Chinese painting during the Tang Dynasty

 Yang Sheng (羊勝; 2nd century BCE), retainer to Liu Wu, Prince of Liang of the Han Dynasty
 Yang Sheng (楊盛; turn of the 5th century CE, Sixteen Kingdoms era), Duke of Chouchi

Given named "Yang-sheng"
 Duke Dao of Qi (born Lü Yangsheng 呂陽生; died 485 BCE), ruler of the State of Qi
 Kao Yang-sheng (高揚昇; born 1952), Taiwanese politician
 Lou Yangsheng (楼阳生, born 1959), Chinese politician, Communist Party Secretary of Henan
 Zhao Yangsheng (赵阳升, born 1955), professor at Taiyuan University of Technology

Other uses
 Yangsheng (Daoism), a concept in religious Daoism traditional Chinese medicine

See also

 Yan Sheng (disambiguation)
 Sheng (disambiguation)
 Yang (disambiguation)
 
 
 Shengyang
 Shen Yang (disambiguation)